The 1933 Cork Junior Hurling Championship was the 37th staging of the Cork Junior Hurling Championship since its establishment by the Cork County Board.

On 20 November 1933, Kinsale won the championship following a 5–04 to 0–01 defeat of Skibberreen in the final at Clonakilty Sportsfield. This was their second championship title overall and their first title since 1918.

References

Cork Junior Hurling Championship
Cork Junior Hurling Championship